This is a list of notable events in Latin music (i.e. Spanish- and Portuguese-speaking music from Latin America, Europe, and the United States) that took place in 2012.

Events
October 20 – Billboard updates their methodology for several of their charts including the Hot Latin Songs. The new methodology for the Hot Latin Songs chart includes sales of digital downloads and streaming activity of Spanish-language songs as well as airplay of Spanish-language songs on all radio stations in the United States. Billboard also imposes a linguistic rule of a song being predominantly sung in Spanish to be eligible to rank on the Hot Latin Songs. Previously, the Hot Latin Songs chart ranked the most-played songs on Spanish-language radio states regardless of language or genre. The Latin Airplay, which was also established, is based on the Hot Latin Song's former methodology.
November 15 — The 13th Annual Latin Grammy Awards are held at the Mandalay Bay Events Center in Las Vegas, Nevada.
"¡Corre!" by Jesse & Joy wins Record the Year and Song of the Year
Juanes: MTV Unplugged by Juanes wins Album of the Year
3Ball MTY wins Best New Artist
Brazilian singer Caetano Veloso was honored as the Latin Recording Academy Person of the Year
December 9 — A plane carrying Mexican-American singer Jenni Rivera and six other passengers crashes near Iturbide, Nuevo León, killing everyone on board.

Number-ones albums and singles by country
List of Hot 100 number-one singles of 2012 (Brazil)
List of number-one songs of 2012 (Colombia)
List of number-one albums of 2012 (Mexico)
List of number-one albums of 2012 (Portugal)
List of number-one albums of 2012 (Spain)
List of number-one singles of 2012 (Spain)
List of number-one Billboard Latin Albums from the 2010s
List of number-one Billboard Top Latin Songs of 2012

Awards
2012 Premio Lo Nuestro
2012 Billboard Latin Music Awards
2012 Latin Grammy Awards
2012 Tejano Music Awards

Albums released

First quarter

January

February

March

Second quarter

April

May

June

Third quarter

July

August

September

Fourth quarter

October

November

December

Unknown

Best-selling records

Best-selling albums
The following is a list of the top 10 best-selling Latin albums in the United States in 2012, according to Billboard.

Best-performing songs
The following is a list of the top 10 best-performing Latin songs in the United States in 2012, according to Billboard.

Deaths
February 8 – Wando, 66, Brazilian singer-songwriter 
February 28 – Frisner Augustin, 63, Haitian drummer and composer  
November 5 – Leonardo Favio, 74, Argentine singer, actor and director
December 9 – Jenni Rivera, 43, US banda singer (plane crash)

References 

 
Latin music by year